Sir James Duke, 1st Baronet (31 January 1792 – 28 May 1873) was a British Liberal Party politician. He was Lord Mayor of London in 1848–1849, and sat in the House of Commons from 1837 to 1865.

Born in Montrose, he was elected at the 1837 general election as a member of parliament (MP) for the borough of Boston in Lincolnshire, and was re-elected at the 1841
and 1847 general elections.

He was elected as Sheriff of the City of London in 1837 and knighted on 5 April of that year. Sir James was Lord Mayor of London in 1847. In June of that year a vacancy arose in the City of London constituency when the Liberal MP James Pattison died at age 62. A group of leading Liberals from the City met on 16 July and resolved to nominate Duke for the vacancy if he would consent, agreeing that:
"impressed with the opinion that the personal character and commercial experience of the Rt. Hon. Sir James Duke, combined with his business habits, and his long acquaintance with public affairs as a member of the House of Commons, eminently qualify him for the representation of the various interests of this city in Parliament"
A deputation was sent to the Mansion House, where Duke was asked to stand, which he immediately agreed to do.

He resigned his Boston seat by taking the Chiltern Hundreds, and at the by-election on 27 July 1849 he was elected as an MP for the City of London constituency, winning more than twice as many votes as his sole opponent, the Conservative Party candidate Lord John Manners.

He was made a baronet in October 1849, on 30 November he was appointed as a commissioner for enquiring into Smithfield Market.
He held the City of London seat until he stood down from the Commons at the 1865 general election.

He was appointed High Sheriff of Sussex for 1872.

References

External links 
 

1792 births
1873 deaths
Liberal Party (UK) MPs for English constituencies
Baronets in the Baronetage of the United Kingdom
UK MPs 1837–1841
UK MPs 1841–1847
UK MPs 1847–1852
UK MPs 1852–1857
UK MPs 1857–1859
UK MPs 1859–1865
Sheriffs of the City of London
19th-century lord mayors of London
19th-century English politicians
High Sheriffs of Sussex